Hugo, the Woman Chaser is a 1969 West German comedy film directed by Hans Albin and starring Peter Garden, Ini Assmann and Maria Brockerhoff.

Cast

References

Bibliography 
 Cowie, Peter. Variety International Film Guide 1970. Tantivy Press, 1969.

External links 
 

1969 films
West German films
German comedy films
1969 comedy films
1960s German-language films
1960s German films